Fritz Lange may refer to:

 Fritz Lange (politician) (1898–1981), minister for national education in the German Democratic Republic
 Fritz Lange (surgeon) (1864–1952), German orthopedic surgeon
 Fritz Lange (canoeist) (born 1940), East German slalom canoeist
 Fritz Lange (wrestler) (1885–?), German wrestler

See also
 Fritz Lang (1890–1976), Austrian-German-American filmmaker
 Fritz Lang (artist) (1877–1961), German painter